The 2018 Oceania Women's Sevens Championship was the eighth Oceania Women's Sevens tournament. It was held in Suva, Fiji on 9–10 November 2018.

Australia won the tournament by defeating defending champions New Zealand in a thrilling final, 14-10. While host Fiji beat Papua New Guinea for third place. Papua New Guinea as the highest ranked non-core team for the 2018–19 World Rugby Women's Sevens Series qualified for the 2019 Sydney Women's Sevens and 2019 Hong Kong Women's Sevens.

Teams

Pool stage
All times are Fiji Summer Time (UTC+13:00)

Pool A

Pool B

Knockout stage

5th to 8th bracket

Cup

Standings

See also
 2019 Hong Kong Women's Sevens

References

2018
2018 in Fijian rugby union
2018 in women's rugby union
2018 rugby sevens competitions
International rugby union competitions hosted by Fiji
Sport in Suva
Oceania Women's Sevens